Stephens Lyne-Stephens (4 October 1801 – 28 February 1860) was an English Tory politician who represented Barnstaple before the 1832 Reform Act. After inheriting a family fortune from glass manufacture in Portugal, he was later reputed to be the richest commoner in England.

Lyne-Stephens was returned as Member of Parliament for Barnstaple in 1830. His father had paid over £5000 for his election which was in support of political reform. On 15 November 1830, Stephens was one of a group of right wing Tories who voted against the government and ended the rule of the Duke of Wellington. Following the political excitement that led to the 1831 Reform Election, Stephens decided not to defend his seat. He concentrated his activities on hunting and shooting. In 1832 he was invited to stand for Liskeard but withdrew his name at the last minute. He moved to Melton Mowbray which he considered excellent hunting and riding country.

In 1837 Stephens married French ballerina Yolande Duvernay. He bought Lynford Hall near Thetford in 1856, intending to develop its  with mansion house, parkland and lake as a hunting retreat, and commissioned the architect William Burn to refurbish it. He was High Sheriff of Norfolk in 1858.

His death in 1860 set off a frenzy of fortune hunters, who went so far as to tamper with their family trees in order to bolster their claims to the estate. The fortune had been amassed by William Stephens of Cornwall, an illegitimate child born in 1731. He started a glass factory in Portugal with his brother and members of the related Lyne family. Stephens had influential political connections in Portugal, exempting his business from taxes.

Notes

References
 Jenefer Roberts Glass:The Strange History of the Lyne Stephens Fortune Templeton Press 2003

External links 
 

1801 births
1860 deaths
UK MPs 1830–1831
Members of the Parliament of the United Kingdom for Barnstaple
High Sheriffs of Norfolk